Edward Greef (born September 22, 1940) is a Republican who previously represented Districts 88 and 90 in the Montana House of Representatives.

References

Living people
1940 births
Republican Party members of the Montana House of Representatives
People from Sandpoint, Idaho
People from Ravalli County, Montana